Edwin G. "Ted" Burrows (May 15, 1943 – May 4, 2018) was a Distinguished Professor of History at Brooklyn College.  He is the co-author of the Pulitzer Prize-winning Gotham: A History of New York City to 1898 (1998), and author of Forgotten Patriots: The Untold Story of American Prisoners During the Revolutionary War, (2008), which won the 2009 Fraunces Tavern Museum Book Award.

Burrows received his BA from the University of Michigan in 1964, and his PhD from Columbia University in 1973, where he studied under Eric McKitrick.  The same year, he began teaching at Brooklyn College, where his course on the History of New York City was one of the college's most popular offerings.   He resided in Northport, New York on Long Island. Burrows died at the age of 74 in May 2018.

References

External links
 Interview with Burrows on "New Books in History"
 C-SPAN's BookTV: Burrows talks about "Forgotten Patriots" at the National Archives, November 19, 2008.

1943 births
2018 deaths
Columbia University alumni
University of Michigan alumni
Pulitzer Prize for History winners
Historians of New York City
Brooklyn College faculty
20th-century American historians
20th-century American male writers
21st-century American historians
21st-century American male writers
People from Northport, New York
Writers from Detroit
Historians from New York (state)
American male non-fiction writers
Historians from Michigan